Robert O'Riordan (1943-2004) was a Canadian author best known for his Cadre trilogy.  He was an English teacher at Sir Robert Borden High School in the Nepean suburb of Ottawa, Ontario, Canada.

Bibliography

Novels 
 1985 - Cadre One 
 1987 - Cadre Lucifer 
 1988 - Cadre Messiah

External links

Robert O'RIORDAN Obituary (2004) - Ottawa Citizen

1943 births
Living people
Canadian fantasy writers
Place of birth missing (living people)
Date of birth missing (living people)